Nathaniel Foster may refer to:
 Nathaniel Greene Foster (1809–1869), American politician, lawyer, and military officer
 Nathaniel Foster (potter) (1781–1853), American potter and merchant
 Nat Foster (1766–1840), American hunter and trapper in the Adirondack Mountains